Cyril Chadwick (11 June 1879 – 3 November 1955) was an English actor of the silent era. He appeared in 70 films between 1913 and 1938. He was born in Kensington, London.

Partial filmography

 Doc (1914) - Eastman
 Mrs. Black Is Back (1914) - Bramley Bush
 Marrying Money (1915) - Archie Vandeveer
 The Smugglers (1916) - Brompton
 Bab's Matinee Idol (1917) - Hon. Page Beresford
 Mrs. Dane's Defense (1918) - James Risbee
 The Richest Girl (1918) - Minor Role
 On the Quiet (1918) - Duke of Carbondale
 Out Yonder (1919) - Reggie Hughes
 His Wife's Money (1920) - James Cardwell
 Clothes (1920) - Arnold West
 The Misleading Lady (1920) - Tracey
 Three Live Ghosts (1922) - Spoofy
 Till We Meet Again (1922) - Gang Member
 Women Men Marry (1922) - Lord Brooks Fitzroy
 Thirty Days (1922) - Huntley Palmer
 The Strangers' Banquet (1922) - Bond
 The Christian (1923) - Lord Robert Ure
 Brass (1923) - Roy North
 Little Church Around the Corner (1923) - Mark Hanford
 Slander the Woman (1923) - Monsieur Lemond
 The Rustle of Silk (1923) - Paul Chalfon
 Don't Marry for Money (1923) - Crane Martin
 The Social Code (1923) - Colby Dickinson
 Happiness (1924) - Philip Chandos
 The Storm Daughter (1924) - The Duke
 The Heart Buster (1924) - Edward Gordon
 The Man Who Came Back (1924) - Captain Trevelan
 The Iron Horse (1924) - Jesson
 Peter Pan (1924) - Mr. Darling
 Forty Winks (1925) - Gasper Le Sage
 The Hunted Woman (1925) - Culver Rann
 His Supreme Moment (1925) - Harry Avon
 Thank You (1925) - Mr. Jones
 Sporting Life (1925) - Lord Phillips Wainwright
 The Best Bad Man (1925) - Frank Dunlap
 The Ship of Souls (1925) - Churchill
 Hold That Lion (1926) - H. Horace Smythe
 Gigolo (1926) - Dr. Gerald Blagden
 Is Zat So? (1927) - Robert Parker
 Foreign Devils (1927) - Lord Vivien Cholmondely
 The Actress (1928) - Capt. de Foenix
 The Mating Call (1928) - Captain Anderson
 Excess Baggage (1928) - Crammon
 The Black Watch (1929) - Maj. Twynes
 The Last of Mrs. Cheyney (1929) - Willie Wynton
 The Thirteenth Chair (1929) - Brandon Trent
 Temple Tower (1930) - Peter Darrell
 The Lady of Scandal (1930) - Sir Reginald Whelby
 Once a Gentleman (1930) - Jarvis
 Sensation Hunters (1933) - Upson
 The Big Bluff (1933)
 Tea Leaves in the Wind (1938)

References

External links

1879 births
1955 deaths
English male film actors
English male silent film actors
People from Kensington
Male actors from London
20th-century English male actors